Yōichi Iha (Iha Yōichi, born January 4, 1952) is a Japanese politician. He has represented the Okinawa at-large district in the Japanese House of Councillors since 2016. He also served two terms as the mayor of Ginowan, Okinawa.

References 

1952 births
Living people
Members of the House of Councillors (Japan)
Politicians from Okinawa Prefecture
Mayors of places in Okinawa Prefecture